Sokongen is an island in the Sermersooq municipality, in eastern Greenland. .

Geography
Sokongen is a coastal island that lies between the Nansen Fjord to the northeast and the J.A.D. Jensen Fjord to the southwest. It is located in an indented area of the eastern Greenland shore where there is a succession of headlands with active glaciers in between. 

Its SE headland is Cape J.A.D. Jensen (68°10'N., 29°48'W.), a massive rocky promontory with steep dark basalt cliffs rising almost 1,000 over the sea, located 15 km to the SW of Cape Nansen.

See also
List of islands of Greenland

References

External links
 Cape Nansen, Greenland

Uninhabited islands of Greenland
ceb:Søkongen Ø
sv:Søkongen Ø